The 2014 women's road cycling season was the second for the  Wiggle–Honda cycling team.

Roster

Ages as of 1 January 2014

Australian criteriums
A few other riders rode at the end of 2014 in name of the team criteriums in Australia.

Riders who joined the team for the 2014 season

Riders who left the team during or after the 2013 season

Season victories

References

2014 UCI Women's Teams seasons
2014 in British sport
2014 season